Crepidolomus is a genus of beetles in the family Carabidae, containing the following species:

 Crepidolomus descarpentriesi Mateu, 1986
 Crepidolomus extimus (Jeannel, 1955)

References

Brachininae